Rivals 2 is an upcoming 2024 platform fighting game that serves as a sequel to Rivals of Aether (2017). Unlike its predecessor, it is played in 2.5D and utilizes 3D models—additional mechanics are also added, including the ability to shield and grab, while mechanics such as the parry return from Rivals of Aether.

The game is intended to have improved single-player and casual-oriented content compared to Rivals of Aether, though appealing to competitive players is the primary focus of development—several mechanics were added to make the game feel more familiar to veteran players. Announced in April 2022, it is planned to be released in 2024 on "as many platforms" as possible, and a closed beta is scheduled for 2023.

Gameplay 

Rivals 2 is a platform fighting game. Unlike its predecessor, Rivals of Aether (2017), it is played in 2.5D and uses 3D models as opposed to being played in 2D and using pixel art sprites.

The game adds several new mechanics—including the ability to generate a shield able to block incoming attacks, the ability to grab others, even while they are shielding, and the ability to "pummel" during a grab with either a short attack or a slower attack with a stronger attack with a unique secondary effect for each character. Further mechanics include the ability to grab ledges and attack while hanging from them and the ability to attack while knocked down. Mechanics such as parries also return from the first game.

Development 
Rivals 2 is intended to have improved single-player content compared to Rivals of Aether that aims to allow casual players to transition into more dedicated players, though competitive play is the priority of the designers—they intend to have the game be prominently featured at Evo.

The addition of the shield mechanic was added to make the game feel more familiar to those who play platform fighting games, and the grab was likewise added as a counter to the shield. Ledges were also added to Rivals 2 because the developers felt that it would make the game feel more familiar to veterans in addition to making it more approachable for newcomers.

Marketing and release 
Rivals 2 was announced on April 1, 2022, during an annual April Fools' Day "Rivals Direct". The game is scheduled to be released in 2024, on "as many platforms" as possible. A closed beta testing period is scheduled for 2023.

References 

Upcoming video games scheduled for 2024
Fantasy video games
Indie video games
Platform fighters
Video game sequels
Multiplayer and single-player video games